"No Sad Song" is a song written in 1971 by Carole King and Toni Stern. It was recorded by Australian singer-songwriter Helen Reddy, appearing on her album Helen Reddy, released in November 1971. The single peaked at number 62 in January 1972 on the Billboard Hot 100 chart, staying on the chart for eight weeks. "No Sad Song" showed up on the Easy Listening (Adult Contemporary) chart for 4 weeks, rising to number 32. It also reached number 51 on the pop chart in Canada's RPM magazine.

Village Voice critic Robert Christgau described "No Sad Song" as a minor hit for Reddy, and a missed chance for King to have a "tougher" song on one of her own albums. Stern's lyrics for "No Sad Song" describe the history and the death of a ladies' man, "stabbed in his bed" where he had brought so many women. The New Yorker called the song "Brecht-and-Weillian", referring to Bertolt Brecht and Kurt Weill, famous for the murder-minded song "Mack the Knife". "No Sad Song" was called a "ballad about the unlamented murder of a rake."

"No Sad Song" was released in North America on 7-inch, 45 rpm vinyl with Reddy's own "More than You Could Take" on the B-side. In early 1972, several European printings of the single were released. Reddy recorded a French-language version of "No Sad Song" translated to "", making it available in both languages in France. French singer Sheila recorded this French version as "" (making it plural "Songs") for her 1972 album Poupée de Porcelaine (Porcelain Doll). Pierre Delanoë wrote the French lyrics about a "suburban Don Juan".

The song is one of two low-performing singles that Reddy put out in 1971, the other being her version of "Crazy Love" by Van Morrison, which rose to number 51 in September 1971. Reddy's first big success was "I Don't Know How to Love Him" which hit number 12 in June 1971, so the next two singles were considered disappointments. It was not until 1972's "I Am Woman" that Reddy hit the top of the charts, the song appearing in frustrating fits in June and September charts then finally breaking through to number 1 in December. Reddy said later to Ms. magazine's Susan Lydon that "No Sad Song" was too antagonistic: "it never took off because it put down men too much."

References

External links
Helen Reddy performs on television in 1972
Helen Reddy – No Sad Song Lyrics on Genius

1971 singles
1971 songs
1972 songs
Capitol Records singles
Helen Reddy songs
Murder ballads
Sheila (singer) songs
Songs written by Carole King
Songs written by Toni Stern